Bradley Ralph (born December 31, 1969) is an American attorney and politician serving as a member of the Kansas House of Representatives from the 119th district. Elected in 2016, he assumed office on January 9, 2017.

Education 
Ralph earned a Bachelor of Arts degree in history from St. Mary of the Plains College in 1981 and a Juris Doctor from the Washburn University School of Law in 1984.

Career 
From 1984 to 2014, Ralph was an attorney and partner at Williams Malone & Ralph in Dodge City, Kansas. In 2014, he was elected the city and prosecuting attorney of Dodge City. In the November 2016 general election for district 119 in the Kansas House of Representatives, Ralph defeated Democratic nominee Daniel L. Love.

References 

Living people
1969 births
People from Dodge City, Kansas
St. Mary of the Plains College alumni
Washburn University School of Law alumni
Kansas lawyers
Republican Party members of the Kansas House of Representatives
21st-century American politicians